Czesław Suszczyk (4 January 1922 – 1 April 1993) was a Polish footballer who competed in the 1952 Summer Olympics.

References

1922 births
1993 deaths
Association football defenders
Polish footballers
Olympic footballers of Poland
Footballers at the 1952 Summer Olympics
Ruch Chorzów players
Raków Częstochowa managers
Poland international footballers
Sportspeople from Chorzów